The following page lists power generating plants in Thailand.

Non-renewable

Renewable

See also 
Energy in Thailand
Energy policy of Thailand
Hydroelectricity in Thailand
List of power stations in Asia
List of largest power stations in the world
Nuclear power in Thailand
Solar power in Thailand
Wind power in Thailand

References

External links
Electricity Generating Authority of Thailand
Gulf Group

Thailand
 
Power stations